Carly Hunt (born 4 June 1981) is a retired English footballer. She played as a midfielder and has represented England at senior international level.

Throughout her career she played alongside her identical twin sister Gemma and they were nicknamed the rottweilers for their aggressive style of play.

Club career
Hunt started playing for Millwall Lionesses' first team as a 14-year-old. The sisters switched to Croydon Women at 16 when the family moved to Dartford.

Croydon won the FA Women's Cup in 2000. Gemma scored the winning goal but Carly missed the final following a cartilage operation. The pair were strongly in favour of Charlton Athletic's controversial and hostile takeover of Croydon Women during that summer.

In December 2000 both sisters were sent off in the same match, Carly for attacking a teammate. The duo were "kicked out" of Charlton Athletic a year later after a huge squad bust-up. They made their debut for Doncaster Belles in February 2002. In September 2003 an on-pitch altercation with former Charlton teammate Carmaine Walker saw another red card for Hunt. Days later the incident spilled over into an England training session, resulting in lengthy bans for Carly and Gemma Hunt, as well as Charlton's Walker and Eartha Pond.

The Hunts left Doncaster Rovers Belles for Leeds United Ladies in 2004, but moved on to AFC Wimbledon Ladies shortly afterwards.

International career
Hunt was the captain of England U-18s. She made senior appearances against Norway and Nigeria in 2002 and Italy in 2003.

References

Living people
1982 births
British identical twins
Footballers from Greater London
Millwall Lionesses L.F.C. players
Charlton Athletic W.F.C. players
Leeds United Women F.C. players
Doncaster Rovers Belles L.F.C. players
English women's footballers
FA Women's National League players
England women's international footballers
Twin sportspeople
English twins
Women's association football midfielders